The ALe 724 are a class of EMUs of the Italian Ferrovie dello Stato, projected for suburban and regional services.

History 
In 1978 the Ferrovie dello Stato received a series of prototype-EMUs, the so-called "Treni GAI", that had for the first time a chopper technology instead of the classical electric equipment.

As the tests of the "treni GAI" were positive, in May 1979 the FS ordered a series of EMUs derived from them. The lombard regional railway company FNM had already ordered in 1978 some similar railcars, numbered E.750.

The FS ordered 60 trains, each made of 4 elements: 30 trains had two railcars and two trailers (ALe 724 + Le 884 + Le 883 + ALe 724) and due to their high acceleration were destined to the suburban services; the other 30 trains had only one railcar, with a driving trailer on the other side (ALe 724 + Le 884 + Le 884 + Le 724) and were destined to the regional services. Each train can carry 320 seated people.

The trains were delivered from 1982 to 1984; 20 trains in the suburban composition went to the Naples metropolitan service substituting the older ALe 803. The other EMUs went to Milan and Turin.

References

Bibliography 
 Erminio Mascherpa: Arrivano le elettromotrici ALe 724. In: "I Treni Oggi" Nr. 23 (October 1982). P. 26–30.
 Giovanni Cornolò: Automotrici elettriche dalle origini al 1983. Duegi Editrice, 2011 (reprint of 1985). P. 249–260.

External links 

ALe 724
Breda multiple units
Railway locomotives introduced in 1982
3000 V DC multiple units